AIDB can refer to any of the following:

 Alabama Institute for the Deaf and Blind
 Accountancy Investigation & Discipline Board